The Spanish Society of Academic Excellence (Sociedad Española De Excelencia Académica, SEDEA) is a Spanish society to promote and disseminate academic excellence and talent.

History 
It was founded in 2019 and its objective is to identify and accredit the best university graduates in Spain and highlight their talent.

Membership 
The society is of limited membership with requirements to access it. To apply for membership in SEDEA, it is an essential requirement to have an average grade higher than 8 out of 10 in the university academic record, for which a verification and accreditation process is followed by society, through the evaluation of the academic trajectory and curricular by the Evaluation Committee of the company. An 8 out of 10 (Spanish system) is equivalent to a 4 out of 5 or a 3.2 out of 4.

Its members include Ignacio Aguaded, full professor, or Eugenio Santos, Spanish microbiologist, professor of microbiology at the University of Salamanca and director of the Spanish Cancer Research Center.

Activities 
Among its functions, in 2019 SEDEA created the National Ranking of the Best Graduates in Spain to recognize the best graduates in the country in each academic discipline. Candidates are selected by a committee of more than 30 professors, researchers and experts in each area of knowledge, classifying the brightest graduates of each degree with a multi-parametric curricular evaluation. The final average grade of the academic record is the factor with the most specific weight in the final assessment. However, more factors are taken into account: high school honours, extraordinary high school award, honours at university degree subjects, having obtained the Extraordinary End of Degree Award, awards or distinctions achieved, international or collaboration scholarships, academic contests or competitions, languages , conducting courses, participating in conferences, lectures at conferences, publications, student representation, volunteering, social commitment and, in general, any other academic merit.

See also 

 Extraordinary Prize of Degree
 Class rank
 Grade inflation
 Honours

References 

Clubs and societies in Spain